John MacInnes Boyd  (born Oban, 14 October 1933) was HM Chief Inspector of Constabulary for Scotland from 1993 to 1996.

He was with the Paisley Burgh Police from 1956 to 1967, the Renfrew and Bute Constabulary from 1967 to 1975 and Strathclyde Police from 1975 to 1984. He was Chief Constable of Dumfries and Galloway Constabulary from 1984 to 1989, and President of ACPO from 1988 to 1989. He joined Her Majesty's Inspectorate of Constabulary in Scotland in 1989 and four years later became its head.

Notes

People from Oban
Scottish police officers
Chief Inspectors of Constabulary (Scotland)
Law enforcement in Scotland
1933 births
Living people
Commanders of the Order of the British Empire
Scottish recipients of the Queen's Police Medal
People educated at Oban High School
British Chief Constables
Officers in Scottish police forces